E. C. Ryer was an American architect from Vermont, where he was one of the earliest local architects.

Ryer opened his office as in Burlington in 1866. In the late 1870s, he left architectural practice to join the Vermont Mutual Life Insurance Company in Montpelier.

Several of Ryer's works contribute to the National Register of Historic Places.

Architectural works
 1868 - Grounds, Our Lady of the Holy Rosary Cemetery, Richmond, Vermont
 1869 - Kilburn & Gates Mill, Kilburn St, Burlington, Vermont
 1869 - Weston's Market, 193-195 College St, Burlington, Vermont
 1870 - Burlington High School, 348 College St, Burlington, Vermont
 Demolished.
 1871 - Chittenden County Courthouse (former), 180 Church St, Burlington, Vermont
 Burned in 1982.
 1871 - Grounds, Lakeview Cemetery, 455 North Ave, Burlington, Vermont
 1872 - Sexton's Residence, Lakeview Cemetery, 455 North Ave, Burlington, Vermont
 1873 - Franklin County Courthouse, 17 Church St, St. Albans, Vermont
 1874 - Bacon Block, 20-26 Church St, Burlington, Vermont
 1876 - St. James Episcopal Church, 14126 Main St, Au Sable Forks, New York

References

American architects
Architects from Vermont